This page details statistics, records, and other achievements pertaining to Michael Jordan.

College statistics 
The three-point line did not exist during Michael Jordan's freshman and junior seasons. During his sophomore season, the three-point line was tested within ACC play. Many other conferences also tested with the line during this season, but again, only within their respective conference competition.

Averages

Totals

NBA career statistics

Averages

Totals 

Source: basketball-reference.com and nba.com

Playoffs 

Source: basketball-reference.com

Awards and accomplishments

NBA achievements 
 Naismith Memorial Basketball Hall of Fame Class of 2009
 6× NBA champion: 1991, 1992, 1993, 1996, 1997, 1998 
 5× NBA Most Valuable Player: 1987–88, 1990–91, 1991–92, 1995–96, 1997–98
 6× NBA Finals Most Valuable Player: 1991, 1992, 1993, 1996, 1997, 1998
 10× Scoring leader: 1986–87, 1987–88, 1988–89, 1989–90, 1990–91, 1991–92, 1992–93, 1995–96, 1996–97, 1997–98
 NBA Defensive Player of the Year: 1987-88
 NBA Rookie of the Year: 1984-85
 14× NBA All-Star: 1985, 1986 (selected but injured), 1987, 1988, 1989, 1990, 1991, 1992, 1993, 1996, 1997, 1998, 2002, 2003
 3× NBA All-Star Game Most Valuable Player: 1988, 1996, 1998
 2× NBA Slam Dunk Contest champion: 1987, 1988
 Runner-up in 1985
 3× Steals leader: 1987–88, 1989–90, 1992–93
 2× Minutes leader: 1987–88, 1988–89
 2× IBM Award winner: 1985, 1989
 11× All-NBA selection:
 First Team: 1987–93, 1996–98
 Second Team: 1985
 9× All-Defensive selection:
 First Team: 1988–93, 1996–98
 NBA All-Rookie selection:
 First Team: 1985
 7× The Sporting News Most Valuable Player: 1987–88, 1988–89, 1990–91, 1991–92, 1995–96, 1996–97, 1997–98
 ''The Sporting News Rookie of the Year: 1985
 Sports Illustrated Sportsman of the Year: 1991
 Ranked #1 by SLAM Magazine's Top 50 Players of All-time
 Ranked #1 by ESPN SportsCentury's Top North American Athletes of the 20th Century
 Selected in 1996 as one of the "50 Greatest Players in NBA History" Selected in 1996 as member of two of the "Top 10 Teams in NBA History"1991–92 Chicago Bulls (67–15; .817)1995–96 Chicago Bulls (72–10; .878)
25 NBA Player of the Week 
16 NBA Player of the Month

 United States National Team 
 2× Olympic gold medals: 1984, 1992
 Tournament of the Americas gold medal: 1992
 Pan American Games gold medal: 1983
 3× USA Basketball Male Athlete of the Year: 1983, 1984 (with Sam Perkins), 1992 (as a part of the 1992 Olympic Team)
 FIBA Hall of Fame (Class of 2015)

 College 
 NCAA National Championship – University of North Carolina: 1981–82
 3× Atlantic Coast Conference regular season champions: 1981–82, 1982–83, 1983–84 (undefeated)
 1982 ACC tournament champions
 ACC Rookie of the Year: 1982
 Naismith College Player of the Year: 1984
 John R. Wooden Award: 1984
 Adolph Rupp Trophy: 1984
 USBWA College Player of the Year: 1984
 AP College Basketball Player of the Year: 1984
 ACC Athlete of the Year: 1984
 ACC Men's Basketball Player of the Year: 1984
 All-ACC First Team: 1983, 1984
 All-ACC Tournament First Team: 1982
 All-ACC Tournament Second Team: 1983, 1984
 2× The Sporting News College Player of the Year: 1983, 1984
 2× Consensus First Team All-American: 1983, 1984
 All-NCAA Tournament Team: 1982
 NCAA Tournament East Regional Team: 1983

 Achievements 

Career: 1,264 games (1,072 regular season, 179 postseason, 13 All-Star)

 Scored 0–1 points in 0 games
 Scored 2–9 points in 15 games (13 regular season, 2 All-Star)
 Scored 10+ points in 1,249 games (1,059 regular season, 179 postseason, 11 All-Star)
 Scored 20+ points in 1,106 games (926 regular season, 173 postseason, 7 All-Star)
 Scored 30+ points in 673 games [NBA record] (1st all time) (562 regular season, 109 postseason, 2 All-Star)
 Scored 35+ points in 410 games [NBA record] (1st all time) (333 regular season, 75 postseason, 2 All-Star)
 Scored 40+ points in 212 games (2nd all time) (173 regular season, 38 postseason, 1 All-Star)
 Scored 50+ points in 39 games (2nd all time) (31 regular season, 8 postseason)
 Scored 60+ points in 5 games (3rd all time) (4 regular season, 1 postseason)
 Recorded 28 Game-winning shots (21 regular season, 7 postseason)
 Recorded 31 Triple-doubles (28 regular season, 2 postseason, 1 All-Star) (13th all time tied)
 Recorded 241 Double-doubles (201 regular season, 39 postseason, 1 All-Star)
 11-time regular season leader, total points (1985, '87–'93, '96–'98)
 10-time regular season leader, scoring average ('86–'93, '95–'98)
 3-time regular season leader, steals ('88, '90, '93)

 University of North Carolina Tar Heels records 
Most points scored by a sophomore: 721 (in 36 games; 1982–83)
During this season, Jordan set his UNC career high with 39 points against Georgia Tech on January 29, 1983.  His previous career high was against Duke on January 22, 1983 (32 points).

 NBA records and former records 

 Regular season 

 Scoring Seasons leading the league in scoring: 10 (–, –)Consecutive seasons leading the league in scoring: 7 (–)
 Also holds second (see below)
 Tied Wilt ChamberlainSeasons leading the league in total points: 11 (–, –)
 In his rookie year, Jordan led the league in points scored, but was third in scoring average behind Bernard King and Larry Bird.First scoring champion with at least 100 three-pointers  – 

Highest scoring average, points per game, career: 30.12 (32,292/1,072)

Seasons averaging 30 or more points per game: 8 (–)

Games scoring 30 or more points, career: 562

Consecutive games scoring 10 or more points: 866,  to Jordan's Streak Crashes and Burns at Indy , National Basketball Association, December 27, 2001. Retrieved April 27, 2013.
 840 with the Chicago Bulls; 26 with the Washington Wizards
 Jordan failed to score in double digits only once as a Bull (8 points in only 16 minutes of play on  vs. the Cleveland Cavaliers, his fifth game upon returning from a broken foot).
 Broken by LeBron James in 2018

Consecutive points scored in a game: 23, vs. Atlanta Hawks, April 16, 1987
 Occurred during the last 6:33 of second quarter (17 points) and first 2:12 of third quarter (6 points)
 Broken since then by several players
 Jordan scored 61 points and set or tied several league records in this game
 Jordan also scored 18 consecutive points, all in the fourth quarter, vs. the New York Knicks on November 21, 1986

Seasons scoring 2,000 or more points: 11 (–, –)
 Broken by Karl Malone in 2000

Oldest player in NBA history to lead the league in scoring: 

Oldest player in NBA history to score 50 points in a game:  (51 points, vs. New Orleans Hornets)
 Broken by Jamal Crawford in 2019

Oldest player in NBA history to score 40 points in a game:  (43 points, vs. New Jersey Nets)
 Jordan is also the only player to score 40+ at age 40 or older.
 In his final season, Jordan scored 40+ 3 times, 30+ 9 times and 20+ 42 times.

Fewest games played to reach 31,000 points: 1,011 games, achieved vs. Portland Trail Blazers, December 10, 2002

Fewest games played to reach 32,000 points: 1,059 games, achieved at Golden State Warriors, March 23, 2003

Outscoring the opposing starting five: Jordan outscored the entire opposing starting five 58–54, Chicago Bulls vs. New Jersey Nets, February 26, 1987
Other players have accomplished this.

 Field goals 
Seasons leading the league in field goals made: 10 (–, –)

Consecutive seasons leading the league in field goals made: 7 (–)
 Also holds second (see below)

Seasons leading the league in field goal attempts: 9 (–, –, –)

 Free throws 
Free throws made, half: 20, second half, at Miami Heat,  (since tied by Devin Booker)
 Also holds third (see below)

Free throws made, quarter: 14, twice
14, fourth quarter, at Utah Jazz, 
14, fourth quarter, at Miami Heat, 
 Broken by Vince Carter on 

Free throw attempts, half: 23, second half, at Miami Heat, 

Free throw attempts, quarter: 16, fourth quarter, at Miami Heat, 
 Broken by Ben Wallace on 

Consecutive free throws made in a game: 19, vs. New Jersey Nets, 
 Shared with others including Bob Pettit on November 22, 1961

 Steals 
Seasons leading the league in steals: 3
 Broken by Chris Paul

Steals, half: 8, first half, at Boston Celtics, 

Games with 8 or more steals, career: 11

 Personal fouls 
Personal fouls, quarter: 6, fourth quarter, vs. Detroit Pistons, 

 Playoffs 

 Scoring 
Points, career: 5,987
 Broken by LeBron James in 2017

Highest scoring average, points per game, career: 33.4 (5,987/179)

Games scoring 50 or more points, career: 8

Consecutive games scoring 50 or more points: 2, vs. Cleveland Cavaliers,  to 
 Jordan is the only player in NBA history to record back-to-back 50-point games in the playoffs, scoring 50 and 55 in Games 1 and 2 against the Cavs.

Games scoring 45 or more points, career: 23

Games scoring 40 or more points, career: 38

Games scoring 30 or more points, career: 109

Games scoring 20 or more points, career: 173
 Jordan failed to score 20 points only six times in 179 playoff games.

Consecutive games scoring 20 or more points: 60,  to 
 Also holds fourth (see below)

Consecutive games scoring 10 or more points: 179,  to 
 Jordan's entire playoff career

Consecutive points scored in a game: 17, during second half (from 73 to 90 points), at New York Knicks, 
 Broken by Ray Allen on 

Points, one postseason: 759 (1992)

Scoring 35 or more points in all games, any playoff series: Twice 
5 games, vs. Cleveland Cavaliers, 1988 First Round 
5 games, vs. Philadelphia 76ers, 1990 Conference Semifinals
 Joined by Jerry West (6 games, Los Angeles Lakers vs. Baltimore Bullets, 1965) and Bernard King (5 games, New York Knicks vs. Detroit Pistons, 1984)

Scoring 30 or more points in all games, any playoff series: Seven times 
3 games, vs. Boston Celtics, 1987 First Round 
5 games, vs. Cleveland Cavaliers, 1988 First Round 
5 games, vs. Cleveland Cavaliers, 1989 First Round 
5 games, vs. Philadelphia 76ers, 1990 Conference Semifinals 
3 games, vs. Miami Heat, 1992 First Round 
6 games, vs. Phoenix Suns, 1993 NBA Finals 
3 games, vs. New Jersey Nets, 1998 First Round
 Joined by Rick Barry, Elgin Baylor, Wilt Chamberlain, Bernard King, Hakeem Olajuwon, Shaquille O'Neal, and Jerry West.

Points, 3-game series: 135, vs. Miami Heat, 1992 First Round (45.0 ppg)
 Also holds second and fourth (see below)

Points, 5-game series: 226, vs. Cleveland Cavaliers, 1988 First Round (45.2 ppg)
 Also holds second and fourth (see below)

Points, game: 63, at Boston Celtics,  (2 OT)
 Jordan has 5 of the top 10 highest scoring games in NBA playoff history.
 Also holds third and fourth (see below)

Points, two consecutive games: 112, at Boston Celtics, 1986 Eastern Conference First Round, April 17 (49), 20 (63), 1986 (56.0 ppg)

Outscoring the opposing team in a quarter: Jordan outscored the entire opposing team 20–19 in the second quarter of Game 1 of the 1988 Eastern Conference First Round, Chicago Bulls vs. Cleveland Cavaliers, April 28, 1988
 Stephen Curry outscored the entire opposing team 16–15 in the first quarter of Game 1 of the 2016 Western Conference First Round, Golden State Warriors vs. Houston Rockets, April 16, 2016

Most points in three quarters: Jordan scored 54 points in three quarters (17 points in the second, 19 in the third and 18 in the fourth) in Game 3 of the 1992 Eastern Conference First Round, Chicago Bulls at Miami Heat, April 29, 1992

Most points without making the NBA Finals, one postseason: 591, 1989, and 587, 1990
 Jordan was the playoff leader in points despite not even making the NBA Finals, the only time this has happened.  He did so twice.

NBA record 5 playoff series averaging at least 40 points per game

 1986 First Round vs Celtics – 43.7 ppg on 51 FG%
 1988 First Round vs Cavaliers – 45.2 ppg on 56 FG%
 1990 Eastern Conference Semifinals vs Sixers – 43.0 ppg on 55 FG%
 1992 First Round vs Heat – 45.0 ppg on 61 FG%
 1993 Finals vs Suns – 41.0 ppg on 51 FG%
No other player in NBA history has more than 1 40ppg+ average in a playoff series of any length. Jordan did it 5 times.
Elgin Baylor 1962 vs the Celtics (40.6 ppg on 43 FG%), Jerry West 1965 vs the Bullets (46.3 ppg on 45 FG%), Rick Barry 1967 vs the 76ers (40.8 ppg on 40 FG%), Bernard King 1984 vs the Pistons (42.6 ppg on 60 FG%) are the only players ever to accomplish this feat.
Jordan was also the last player in history to do this when he averaged 41.0 ppg in the NBA Finals of 1993 vs the Suns.
Jordan by himself has 5 of the top 7 highest scoring playoff series displays in NBA history.

 Field goals 
Field goals made, 3-game series: 53, vs. Miami Heat, 1992 First Round
 Also holds third (see below)

Field goals made, 5-game series: 86, vs. Philadelphia 76ers, 1990 Conference Semifinals
 Also holds second (see below)

Field goals made, 6-game series: 101, vs. Phoenix Suns, 1993 NBA Finals

Field goals made, game: 24, vs. Cleveland Cavaliers, 
 Also holds third and fourth (see below)

Consecutive field goals made in a game without a miss: 13, vs. Los Angeles Lakers, 

Field goal attempts, career: 4,497
 Broken by Kobe Bryant on May 21, 2012

Field goal attempts, half: 25, first half, vs. Cleveland Cavaliers, 
 Also holds second and third (see below)

 Three-point field goals 
Three-point field goals made, half: 6, first half, vs. Portland Trail Blazers, 
 Broken by Vince Carter on 

Three-point field goal attempts, half: 9, first half, vs. Portland Trail Blazers, 
 Broken by John Starks on 

 Free throws 
Free throws made, career: 1,463

Free throws made, one postseason: 183 (1989)
 Broken by Dirk Nowitzki in 2006

Free throws made, game (regulation): 23, vs. New York Knicks, 
 Broken by Dirk Nowitzki on May 17, 2011
 Also holds third (see below)

Free throws made, half: 14, second half, vs. Detroit Pistons, 
Broken by Magic Johnson on 

Free throws made, quarter: 13, fourth quarter, vs. Detroit Pistons, 
 Tied by Dirk Nowitzki on April 16, 2011
 Also holds third (see below)

Free throw attempts, career: 1,766
 Broken by Shaquille O'Neal

Free throw attempts, one postseason: 229 (1989)
 Broken by Shaquille O'Neal in 1995

Free throw attempts, 4-game series: 58, vs. Milwaukee Bucks, 1985 First Round
 Broken by Shaquille O'Neal in 1999

Free throw attempts, game (regulation): 28, vs. New York Knicks, 
 Broken by Shaquille O'Neal on 
 Also holds fourth (see below)

Free throw attempts, half: 17, second half, vs. New York Knicks, 
 Broken by Magic Johnson on 

Free throw attempts, quarter: 14, fourth quarter, vs. Detroit Pistons, 
 Broken by Shaquille O'Neal on 

 Steals 
Steals, career: 376
 Broken by LeBron James in 2017

 NBA Finals 

 Scoring 
Highest scoring average, points per game, any championship series: 41.0 (246/6), vs. Phoenix Suns, 1993 NBA Finals

Points, 6-game series: 246, vs. Phoenix Suns, 1993 NBA Finals (41.0 ppg)
 Also holds fourth (see below)

Consecutive games scoring 40 or more points: 4, vs. Phoenix Suns,  to 

Consecutive games scoring 20 or more points: 35,  to 
 Jordan's entire Finals career

Scoring 30 or more points in all games, any championship series: 6 games, vs. Phoenix Suns, 1993 NBA Finals
 Also achieved by Elgin Baylor (1962), Rick Barry (1967), Hakeem Olajuwon (1995), and Shaquille O'Neal (2000, 2002)

Points, half: 35, first half, vs. Portland Trail Blazers, 
 Also holds second (see below)

 Field goals 
Field goals made, 6-game series: 101, vs. Phoenix Suns, 1993 NBA Finals

Field goals made, half: 14, twice 
14, first half, vs. Portland Trail Blazers,  
14, first half, vs. Phoenix Suns, 
 Also holds third and fourth (see below)

Consecutive field goals made in a game without a miss: 13, vs. Los Angeles Lakers, 

Field goals made, 5-game series: 63, vs. Los Angeles Lakers, 1991 NBA Finals
 Broken by Allen Iverson in 2001

Field goal attempts, 6-game series: 199, vs. Phoenix Suns, 1993 NBA Finals

 Three-point field goals 
Three-point field goals made, career: 42
 Broken by Robert Horry

Three-point field goals made, game: 6, vs. Portland Trail Blazers, 
 Broken by Kenny Smith on 

Three-point field goals made, half: 6, first half, vs. Portland Trail Blazers, 
 Broken by Ray Allen on 

Three-point field goal attempts, game: 10, vs. Portland Trail Blazers, 
 Broken by John Starks on 

Three-point field goal attempts, half: 10, first half, vs. Portland Trail Blazers, 
 Broken by John Starks on 

 Free throws 
Free throws made, quarter: 9, second quarter, at Utah Jazz, 

Free throw attempts, half: 15, second half, vs. Utah Jazz, 
 Broken by Shaquille O'Neal on 

Free throw attempts, quarter: 12, fourth quarter, vs. Utah Jazz, 
 Broken by Shaquille O'Neal on 

 Steals 
Steals, 5-game series: 14, vs. Los Angeles Lakers, 1991 NBA Finals (2.8 spg)

 All-Star 
Points, career: 262
 Broken by Kobe Bryant (290) and then LeBron James (291)

Field goals made, career: 110
 Broken by Kobe Bryant and LeBron James (119)

Field goals made, game: 17, 1988
 Broken by Blake Griffin

Field goal attempts, career: 233

Field goal attempts, game: 27, 2003 (2 OT)
 Broken by Russell Westbrook

Steals, career: 37

Blocked shots, half: 4, 1988

 Other records 

 Regular season 
NBA All-Defensive First Team selections: 9

Blocked shots by a guard, career: 893.

Blocked shots by a guard, season: 131

Most seasons all time of 100+ blocks by a guard (x2) 125 blocks, 131 blocks. Jordan is the only guard in history to have more than 1 season of 100+ blocks.

Tied with Alvin Robertson. Also, the all-time record regardless of position.

Highest Player Efficiency Rating of all time, career: 27.91

Highest Box Plus/Minus of all-time career: 9.22

Most times leading the league in Win Shares, all-time career: 9 times

Most times leading the league in Box Plus/Minus, all-time career: 10 times

Most times leading the league in Value Over Replacement Player (VORP), all-time career: 9 times (Jordan has 6 of the 10 highest VORP seasons ever recorded)

Most times leading the league in PER, all-time career: 7 times

Highest Win Shares / 48 of all-time career: 0.2505

Only rookie in NBA history to lead his team in four statistics
 Jordan led the 1984–85 Chicago Bulls in scoring (28.2 ppg), rebounding (6.5 rpg), assists (5.9 apg) and steals (2.4 spg).
 Jordan again led the Bulls in four statistics in 1987–88, this time leading the team in scoring (35.0 ppg), assists (5.9 apg), steals (3.2 spg) and blocked shots (1.6 bpg).

Second rookie in NBA history to average 20+ points, 5+ rebounds, and 5+ assists
 Oscar Robertson, LeBron James and Tyreke Evans have also achieved this.
 Jordan averaged 28.2 points, 6.5 rebounds and 5.9 assists per game.  He led all rookies in scoring and steals (2.4 per game).

One of two players in NBA history to score 3,000 points in a season: 3,041 points scored in 82 games played (37.1 ppg)
 Wilt Chamberlain is the only other player to achieve this, a feat he accomplished three times.

First player in NBA history to record 200 steals and 100 blocked shots in a season: 236 steals, 125 blocks
 Hakeem Olajuwon and Scottie Pippen are the only other players to do so.

Only player in NBA history with more than one season of 200 steals and 100 blocked shots: 259 steals, 131 blocks

Only player in NBA history to lead the league in scoring and win Defensive Player of the Year in the same season
 Jordan averaged 35 points per game.

First player in NBA history to win Rookie of the Year, Defensive Player of the Year and Most Valuable Player during his career
 David Robinson is the only other player to achieve this.

First player in NBA history to lead the league in scoring and win Defensive Player of the Year during his career
 David Robinson is the only other player to achieve this.

Only player in NBA history to lead the league in scoring, win Most Valuable Player, and Defensive Player of the Year in the same season

First player in NBA history to win Most Valuable Player and Defensive Player of the Year in the same season
 Hakeem Olajuwon and Giannis Antetokounmpo are the only other players to achieve this.

First player in NBA history to lead the league both in scoring and steals in the same season
 Allen Iverson is the only other player to do so, and has performed the feat twice.

Fourth player in NBA history to lead the league in scoring and win the NBA championship in the same season
 Jordan is the only player to achieve this more than once; he did this six times

One of three players in history to sweep the Most Valuable Player awards for the regular season, All-Star Game and NBA Finals in the same season
 Willis Reed and Shaquille O'Neal are the only other players to achieve this; Jordan is the only player to perform the feat twice.

One of three players in history to win an Olympic gold medal both as an amateur and professional (1984, 1992)
 Patrick Ewing and Chris Mullin have also achieved this, playing on the same teams with Jordan.

Sixth player in history to win an Olympic gold medal, NCAA championship and NBA championship
 Clyde Lovellette, Bill Russell, K.C. Jones, Jerry Lucas, Quinn Buckner and Earvin "Magic" Johnson have also achieved this.

Only player in NBA history to win Rookie of the Year, Defensive Player of the Year, NBA MVP, All-Star MVP (1988, 1996, 1998), and Finals MVP (1991, 1992, 1993, 1996, 1997, 1998)

Led the 1995–96 Chicago Bulls to the second-best regular season record in NBA history (72 wins, 10 losses)
 Jordan averaged a league-leading 30.4 ppg
 The 2015–16 Golden State Warriors, who won 73 regular-season games, are the winningest regular season team in NBA history.

Led the 1995–96 Chicago Bulls to the best combined regular season and postseason record in NBA history (87 wins, 13 losses)

 Playoffs 
Only player in NBA history to score 15 or more points in all games in his career: 179 games

Outscored 268 of 269 opponents faced in the playoffs on points per game 
 Michael Jordan outscored all but one opponent he faced in his playoffs career. The exception was in the 1985 Eastern conference 1st round in Jordan's rookie season when Milwaukee Bucks power forward Terry Cummings outscored Jordan (29.5 ppg to Jordan's 29.3 ppg).

Highest Player Efficiency Rating all time playoffs, career: 28.6

Highest Box Plus/Minus all time, all time playoffs career: 11.14

Only guard in NBA history to lead his team in all 5 categories (points, rebounds, assists, steals, blocks) during a playoff series
 1989 Eastern Conference Semifinals vs. New York Knicks 
Jordan came close to leading all 5 categories in a playoff series on 3 more occasions
 1991 Eastern Conference Semifinals vs. Philadelphia 76ers, (short 7 rebounds)
 1993 Eastern Conference Finals vs. New York Knicks, (short 3 rebounds)
 1997 Eastern Conference Semifinals vs. Atlanta Hawks, (short 2 assists)

Only player in NBA history to average at least 30 points, 6 rebounds, 5 assists, 2 steals in a playoff run (7 times)
 Jordan did this in the 1986, 1987, 1989, and 1990 Playoffs, and in the Bulls' 1991, 1992, and 1993 championship runs

Only player in NBA history to average at least 30 points, 6 rebounds, 6 assists, 2 steals in a playoff run (5 times)
 Jordan did this in the 1987, 1989, and 1990 Playoffs, and in the Bulls' 1991 and 1993 championship runs

Only player in NBA history to average at least 30 points, 6 rebounds, 6 assists in a title run (2 times)
 Jordan did this in the Bulls' 1991 and 1993 championship runs, while also averaging at least 2 steals in both of those runs

Averaged at least 30 points, 6 rebounds, 4 assists, 2 steals in a record 9 different playoff runs
 Jordan did this in each of his 9 playoff appearances from 1986 to 1995 (Jordan was retired during the 1994 Playoffs)
 Tracy McGrady is the only other player to average at least 30 points, 6 rebounds, 4 assists, 2 steals in a playoff run, when he lost in the first round of the 2003 Playoffs.

Only player in NBA history to shoot at least 38% on 3-point field goals in 3 NBA Finals runs (minimum 15 points per game and 1.5 three-point attempts per game)
 Jordan did this in the Bulls' 1991, 1992, and 1993 championship runs under the original 3-point line. He also did it in the 1996 championship run, but with a shorter 3-point line
 Four other players meet this criteria in multiple NBA Finals runs
 Terry Porter (1990 and 1992)
 Manu Ginobili (2005 and 2007)
 Ray Allen (2008 and 2010)
 Stephen Curry (2015 and 2016)

In the 1997 title run, Jordan led a championship team in all 5 main categories (points, rebounds, assists, steals, blocks) for the last 3 rounds of the 1997 Playoffs
 Hakeem Olajuwon is the only other player to do this, when he led the 1994 Rockets in all 5 main categories for the entire 4-round playoffs
 Jordan and Dennis Rodman tied with 133 rebounds (8.3 rpg) for the last 3 rounds.
 Jordan was 10 rebounds (0.53 rebounds per game) and 1 block (0.05 blocks per game) shy of leading the Bulls in all 5 categories for the entire 4-round playoffs

Only player in NBA history to lead a team to the championship with only one teammate averaging double figures in scoring
 In the Bulls' 1997 playoff run, Scottie Pippen averaged 19 points per game on 42% shooting. All other teammates of Jordan averaged under 8 points per game

 Finals 
Most Valuable Player awards: 6 (1991, 1992, 1993, 1996, 1997, 1998)
 Jordan was named MVP in every Finals appearance.  He averaged 33.6 points, 6 rebounds and 6 assists per game for his Finals career.

Scoring 20 or more points in all games, career: 35 games
 Jordan and Rick Barry (10 games) are the only players in NBA history to score 20+ in every Finals game.

One of seven players to lead a team in 4 out of 5 categories for an NBA Finals
 Jordan led the 1991 Bulls in points, assists, steals, and blocks.
 The other players to do this are Kareem Abdul-Jabbar (1974), Hakeem Olajuwon (1986), Magic Johnson (1987), Larry Bird (1987), Tim Duncan (2003, 2007), and LeBron James (2013, 2014, 2015, 2016, 2017, and 2018)

 All-Star 
Most Valuable Player awards: 3 (1988, 1996, 1998)
 Tied with Bob Pettit and Kobe Bryant, both of whom won 3 outright, and 1 shared.

First player to record a triple-double in All-Star Game history: 14 points, 11 rebounds, 11 assists in 26 minutes (1997)
 LeBron James recorded the second triple-double in All-Star Game history in 2011, with 29 points, 12 rebounds, 11 assists in 32 minutes.
 Dwyane Wade recorded the third triple-double in All-Star Game history in 2012 NBA All-Star Game, with 24 points, 10 rebounds, 10 assists in 33 minutes.
 Kevin Durant recorded the third triple-double in All-Star Game history in 2017 NBA All-Star Game, with 21 points, 10 rebounds, 10 assists in 27 minutes.

 Set with Scottie Pippen 
Ninth pair of teammates in NBA history to score 40 or more points in the same game: Chicago Bulls (110) at Indiana Pacers (102), 
 Jordan: 44 points, 5 rebounds, 7 assists, 3 steals, 2 blocks in 42 minutes
 Pippen: 40 points, 10 rebounds, 2 assists, 5 steals in 44 minutes

One of at least three pairs of teammates in NBA history to record triple-doubles in the same game: Chicago Bulls (126) vs. Los Angeles Clippers (121),  (OT)
 Jordan: 41 points, 10 rebounds, 11 assists (and six steals) in 47 minutes
 Pippen: 15 points, 10 rebounds, 12 assists (and two steals) in 42 minutes
 Jason Kidd and Vince Carter achieved this feat as well on 

 Chicago Bulls franchise records 
Michael Jordan holds approximately 200 records as a Chicago Bull; these are some of them.

 Regular season 

 Service 
Seasons played: 13

Games played, career: 930

Games played, season: 82
 Tied with many other players

Minutes played, career: 35,887

 Scoring 
Points, career: 29,277

Scoring average, points per game, career: 31.5 (29,277 points in 930 games)

Points, season: 3,041

Scoring average, points per game, season: 37.1 (3,041/82)

Points, game (overtime): 69, at Cleveland Cavaliers, 

Points, game (regulation): 61, vs. Atlanta Hawks, 

Points, half: 39, second half, vs. Milwaukee Bucks, 
Broken by Jimmy Butler (40, at Toronto Raptors, January 3, 2016)

Points, quarter: 30, fourth quarter, at Denver Nuggets, 

Consecutive points, game: 23, last 6:33 of second quarter and first 2:12 of third quarter, vs. Atlanta Hawks, 

Consecutive points, quarter: 18, vs. New York Knicks, 

 Field goals 
Field goals made, career: 10,962

Field goals made, season: 1,098

Field goals made, game (overtime): 27, vs. Orlando Magic, 

Field goals made, game (regulation): 24, at Philadelphia 76ers, 

Field goals made, half: 15, first half, vs. Orlando Magic, 

Field goals made, quarter: 11, twice 
11, first quarter, vs. Orlando Magic, 

Field goal attempts, career: 21,686

Field goal attempts, season: 2,279

Field goal attempts, game (overtime): 49, vs. Orlando Magic, 

Field goal attempts, game (regulation): 43, thrice 
43, at Los Angeles Lakers,  
43, vs. Houston Rockets,  
43, vs. Orlando Magic, 

Field goal attempts, half: 24, twice 
24, second half, vs. Orlando Magic, 

Field goal attempts, overtime: 8, vs. Seattle SuperSonics, 

 Three-point field goals 
Three-point field goals made, game: 7, vs. Golden State Warriors, 
 Broken by Chris Duhon on 

 Free throws 
Free throws made, one missed, game: 26–27, vs. New Jersey Nets, 

Free throws made, career: 6,798

Free throws made, season: 833

Free throws made, game: 26, vs. New Jersey Nets, 

Free throws made, half: 20, second half, at Miami Heat, 

Free throws made, quarter: 14, twice 
14, fourth quarter, at Utah Jazz,  
14, fourth quarter, at Miami Heat, 

Free throw attempts, career: 8,115

Free throw attempts, season: 972

Free throw attempts, game: 27, vs. New Jersey Nets, 

Free throw attempts, half: 23, second half, at Miami Heat, 

Free throw attempts, quarter: 16, fourth quarter, at Miami Heat, 

 Rebounding 
Rebounds, career: 5,836

Defensive rebounds, career: 4,289

 Assists 
Assists, career: 5,012

 Steals 
Steals, career: 2,306

Steals, season: 259

Consecutive games with a steal: 77,  to 

Steals, game: 10, vs. New Jersey Nets, 

Steals, half: 8, first half, at Boston Celtics, 

Steals, quarter: 6, third quarter, vs. New Jersey Nets, 

 Personal fouls 
Personal fouls, quarter: 6, fourth quarter, vs. Detroit Pistons, 

 Turnovers 
Turnovers, career: 2,589

Minutes played: 3,144

Points: 2,313

Scoring average, points per game: 28.3 (2,313/82)

Field goals made: 837

Field goal attempts: 1,625

Free throws made: 630

Free throw attempts: 746

Steals: 196

 Playoffs 

 Service 
Games played, career: 179

Minutes played, career: 7,474

 Scoring 
Points, career: 5,987

Points, game (overtime): 63, at Boston Celtics,  (2 OT)

Points, game (regulation): 56, at Miami Heat, 

Points, half: 37, second half, at Miami Heat, 

Points, quarter: 24, fourth quarter, at Philadelphia 76ers, 

Points, overtime: 9, at New York Knicks, 

Consecutive points, game: 17, during second half (from 73 to 90 points), at New York Knicks, 

 Field goals 
Field goals made, career: 2,188

Field goals made, game: 24, vs. Cleveland Cavaliers, 

Field goals made, half: 14, four times 
14, first half, vs. Cleveland Cavaliers,  
14, second half, at Philadelphia 76ers,  
14, first half, vs. Portland Trail Blazers,  
14, first half, vs. Phoenix Suns, 

Field goals made, quarter: 10, fourth quarter, at Philadelphia 76ers, 

Field goals made, overtime: 4, at New York Knicks, 

Field goal attempts, career: 4,497

Field goal attempts, game: 45, vs. Cleveland Cavaliers, 

Field goal attempts, half: 25, first half, vs. Cleveland Cavaliers, 

Field goal attempts, quarter: 13, first quarter, vs. Portland Trail Blazers, 

Field goal attempts, overtime: 5, first overtime, at Boston Celtics, 

 Three-point field goals 
Three-point field goals made, half: 6, first half, vs. Portland Trail Blazers, 

Three-point field goal attempts, half: 10, first half, vs. Portland Trail Blazers, 

 Free throws 
Free throws made, career: 1,463

Free throws made, game: 23, vs. New York Knicks, 

Free throws made, half: 14, second half, vs. Detroit Pistons, 

Free throws made, quarter: 13, fourth quarter, vs. Detroit Pistons, 

Free throws made, overtime: 3, vs. New Jersey Nets, 

Free throw attempts, career: 1,766

Free throw attempts, game: 28, vs. New York Knicks, 

Free throw attempts, half: 17, second half, vs. New York Knicks, 

Free throw attempts, quarter: 14, fourth quarter, vs. Detroit Pistons, 

Free throw attempts, overtime: 5, vs. New Jersey Nets, 

 Assists 
Assists, career: 1,022

Assists, game: 14, at New York Knicks, 

 Personal fouls 
Personal fouls, overtime: 3, vs. Cleveland Cavaliers, 

 Steals 
Steals, career: 376

Steals, game: 6, four times
 6, vs. Detroit Pistons, 
 6, vs. New York Knicks, 
 6, vs. Philadelphia 76ers, 
 6, at New York Knicks, 

 Washington Wizards franchise records 
Points, half: 34, first half, vs. Charlotte Hornets, 

Points, first quarter: 24, vs. Charlotte Hornets, 

Points, second quarter: 19, vs. Chicago Bulls, 

MCI Center record — points, game: 51, vs. Charlotte Hornets, 
 Shared with Gilbert Arenas

 Career highs 

 Regular season 

 Playoffs 

 NBA Finals 

Career highs against opponents

*Jordan scored 50 points against the Milwaukee Bucks twice.  The most recent occurrence is listed.
**Jordan scored 45 points against the Seattle SuperSonics twice.  The most recent occurrence is listed.

Milestones

*Excluding the Washington Bullets
**Expansion era, and including the Washington Bullets

 NBA regular season leader 
 Scoring (10 seasons): 1987 (37.1), 1988 (35.0), 1989 (32.5), 1990 (33.6), 1991 (31.5), 1992 (30.1), 1993 (32.6), 1996 (30.4), 1997 (29.6), 1998 (28.7)
 Steals per game (3 seasons): 1988 (3.2), 1990 (2.8), 1993 (2.8)
 Field goals made (10 seasons): 1987 (1,098), 1988 (1,069), 1989 (966), 1990 (1,034), 1991 (990), 1992 (943), 1993 (992), 1996 (916), 1997 (920), 1998 (881)
 Field goal attempts (9 seasons): 1987 (2,279), 1988 (1,998), 1990 (1,964), 1991 (1,837), 1992 (1,818), 1993 (2,003), 1996 (1,850), 1997 (1,892), 1998 (1,893)
 Free throws made (2 seasons): 1987 (833), 1988 (723)
 Free throw attempts (1 season): 1987 (972)
 Points (11 seasons): 1985 (2,313), 1987 (3,041), 1988 (2,868), 1989 (2,633), 1990 (2,753), 1991 (2,580), 1992 (2,404), 1993 (2,541), 1996 (2,491), 1997 (2,431), 1998 (2,357)
 Steals (3 seasons): 1988 (259), 1990 (227), 1993 (221)
 Minutes played (3 seasons): 1987 (3,281), 1988 (3,311), 1989 (3,255)
 Games played (5 seasons): 1985 (82), 1987 (82), 1990 (82), 1991 (82), 1998 (82)
 Jordan played in all 82 of his team's games in nine different seasons.

 Other notes 
 Regular season games in which Jordan was leading scorer: 700 *Michael Jordan 2001–02 Game Log | Basketball-Reference.com
 Regular season games in which Jordan was team's leading scorer: 867 *
 Regular season games in which Jordan was Bulls leading scorer: 793 *
 Percentage of team's points, career: .290 (32,292/111,541)
 Highest percentage of team's points, game: .602 (56/93), March 24, 1987 vs. Philadelphia 76ers
 Jordan played in 1072''' regular season games in his career.
* Including ties

50-point games

Triple doubles

Near misses with a quadruple-double

Near misses with a five-by-five

Game-winning shots

Wins and losses 
During his time in the NBA, the Chicago Bulls teams on which Michael Jordan played set numerous league records for winning, both in the regular season and postseason.  However, since wins and losses are a team achievement, only lesser known statistics are listed here.

The longest losing streak of his career was eight games, which occurred during his third stint in the NBA, with the Washington Wizards (November 4 to 22, 2001).
The longest losing streak of his Chicago Bulls career was six games, which occurred twice (March 9 to 17, 1987 and April 6 to 16, 1989).  This latter losing streak began with the last game of Jordan's triple-double streak.
The longest losing streak of the Chicago Bulls dynasty era was three games, which occurred at the very beginning of the era (November 2 to 6, 1990).
The longest winning streak of his career was 18 games, which occurred from December 29, 1995, to February 2, 1996.  At the time, it was tied for the third longest winning steak in NBA history, and is now tied for the 11th longest winning streak in NBA history.  It is the longest winning streak in Chicago Bulls franchise history.
The Chicago Bulls also set the NBA playoff record for consecutive road victories at eight, across the 1991 and 1992 postseasons.  It was later broken by the Los Angeles Lakers during a stretch from 2001 to 2002.

See also 
 List of National Basketball Association top rookie scoring averages
 List of National Basketball Association top individual scoring season averages
 List of National Basketball Association annual scoring leaders
 List of National Basketball Association annual steals leaders
 List of National Basketball Association annual minutes leaders
 List of National Basketball Association players with most points in a game
 List of National Basketball Association players with most steals in a game
 List of National Basketball Association single-game playoff scoring leaders
 List of National Basketball Association career scoring leaders
 List of National Basketball Association career steals leaders
 List of National Basketball Association career turnovers leaders
 List of National Basketball Association career free throw scoring leaders
 List of National Basketball Association franchise career scoring leaders
 List of National Basketball Association career playoff scoring leaders
 List of National Basketball Association career playoff assists leaders
 List of National Basketball Association career playoff steals leaders
 List of National Basketball Association career playoff turnovers leaders
 List of National Basketball Association career playoff 3-point scoring leaders
 List of National Basketball Association career playoff free throw scoring leaders
 List of NBA players with most championships
 List of multi-sport athletes

References

External links 
 Michael Jordan: Player Profile at nba.com
 Career statistics at databasebasketball.com
 Career Statistics and Game Logs at basketball-reference.com
 Chicago Bulls Media Guide – Regular Season Records
 Chicago Bulls Media Guide – Playoff Records
 Harvey Pollack's Statistical Yearbook

 Career achievements
Jordan, Michael
Jordan, Michael, Career achievements